The Paringa River is a river of the West Coast Region of New Zealand's South Island. Geologist Jeremy Kilner wrote his 2005 bachelor's with honours thesis at the University of Otago about this valley; the title of his thesis was: Geophysical survey of the Paringa River valley, South Westland.

See also
List of rivers of New Zealand

References

Rivers of the West Coast, New Zealand
Rivers of New Zealand
Westland District